The 1968 Mauritian riots refers to a number of violent clashes that occurred in the Port Louis neighbourhoods of Bell Village, Roche Bois, St. Coix Cité Martial and Plaine Verte in Mauritius over a period of ten days, six weeks before the country's declaration of independence on 12 March 1968.  The riot was the result of communal conflict between Creoles and Indo-Mauritian Muslims, and had its roots in gang warfare and concerns arising from the country's future following independence.

Riots
Political tension was high at the time due to uncertainty about the future political situation in the country after independence.  With about half the country being against independence due to concerns that they might lose out in the new government.

Order was restored by a company of the King's Shropshire Light Infantry called in from Singapore after a state of emergency was declared by the British authorities on 22 January 1968 and lasted for ten days.  In their effort to restore order the British deployed three Bell H-13 Sioux helicopters and around 150 troops. Violence was contained to the urban areas of Port Louis and did not spread to the rest of the island.

See also
 Uba riots of 1937
 1943 Belle Vue Harel Massacre
 1965 Mauritius race riots
 1967 Port Louis riots

References

Riots
Murder in Mauritius
Mauritian riots
History of Mauritius
Ethnic riots
Riots and civil disorder in Mauritius
Mauritian riots
Anti-Indian racism in Africa